Aden William James Baldwin (born 10 June 1997) is an English professional footballer who plays as a defender for National League club Notts County.

Club career

Forest Green Rovers
Baldwin joined Forest Green Rovers as a 15-year-old and combined football with education at South Gloucestershire and Stroud College. He made his debut for Forest Green against Cheltenham Town in the Gloucestershire Senior Challenge Cup in April 2014 before signing a professional contract at the end of the 2014–15 season. On 20 August 2015, Baldwin joined National League South club Bath City on a one-month loan deal.

Bristol City
In January 2016, Baldwin signed for Championship side Bristol City on a two-and-a-half-year contract. On 12 October 2016, Baldwin joined National League South club Weston-super-Mare on a 93-day loan deal. He rejoined Weston-super-Mare on loan for a further two-month period ahead of the 2017–18 season. 

In August 2018, he moved on loan to League Two club Cheltenham Town until January 2019. His loan spell was cut short after he suffered a serious knee injury which ruled him out for four months against Milton Keynes Dons in October 2018. 

In February 2020, Baldwin signed a new contract with Bristol City until June 2021 with the option of a further year, and joined National League side Eastleigh on loan until the end of the season.

Milton Keynes Dons
On 13 July 2021, Baldwin joined League One side Milton Keynes Dons following his release from Bristol City. He made his debut for the club on 31 July 2021, in a 5–0 EFL Cup first round defeat away to Bournemouth. Having made 16 appearances for the club, Baldwin was later one of six players released at the end of the 2021–22 season.

Notts County
On 21 June 2022, Baldwin signed a two-year deal with National League club Notts County, effective from 1 July 2022.

Career statistics

References

1997 births
Living people
English footballers
Association football defenders
Forest Green Rovers F.C. players
Bath City F.C. players
Bristol City F.C. players
Weston-super-Mare A.F.C. players
Cheltenham Town F.C. players
Eastleigh F.C. players
Milton Keynes Dons F.C. players
Notts County F.C. players
English Football League players
National League (English football) players